A partial solar eclipse observable from parts of Antarctic Ocean and Indian Ocean occurred on March 27, 1960. A solar eclipse occurs when the Moon passes between Earth and the Sun, thereby totally or partly obscuring the image of the Sun for a viewer on Earth. A partial solar eclipse occurs in the polar regions of the Earth when the center of the Moon's shadow misses the Earth.

Related eclipses

Solar eclipses of 1957–1960

References

External links 
 http://eclipse.gsfc.nasa.gov/SEplot/SEplot1951/SE1960Mar27P.GIF

1960 3 27
1960 in science
1960 3 27
March 1960 events